Kitty Wu is a Danish alternative rock band, named after a character in Paul Auster's novel Moon Palace. Kitty Wu was founded in 1998 in Copenhagen.

Their debut album, Privacy, released in 2001 to positive reviews. The following releases The Rules of Transportation (2003) and Knives and Daggers (2005) further cemented the band's uncompromising reputation.
These albums also marked the beginning of a series of artistic relationships with some musical profiles who helped shape Kitty Wu, among them Guy Fixsen (Pixies, My Bloody Valentine) and, most importantly, the band's mentor Rob Ellis (PJ Harvey, Marianne Faithfull, Anna Calvi).
In 2009, Kitty Wu released their fourth album Someone Was Here, an album that, despite a wider soundscape, was to be their first as a trio. Their 5th album, Carrier Pigeons, was released in 2012.

The first sketches appeared in Berlin, where singer and songwriter Robert Lund had relocated to for a time. He continued the work during prolonged stays in New York, and songs were periodically brought home to the band to be recorded in their makeshift Copenhagen studio. The album was mixed by John O’mahony(The Cribs, Metric) in Jimi Hendrix’ Electric Lady Studios in New York's West Village.

Discography 

Albums:

Privacy, 2001 (MNW)
The Rules of Transportation, 2003 (Universal/Mercury)
Knives and Daggers, 2005 (Alarm Music/Fast Getaway)
Someone Was Here, 2009 (Alarm Music/Fast Getaway)
Carrier Pigeons, 2012 (Alarm Music/Fast Getaway)

Singles:

I'm not going fast, 2001 (MNW)
Eva Braun, 2001 (MNW)
Stay Indoors, 2001 (MNW)
Arms Raised, 2003 (Universal/Mercury)
This Building Is On Fire, 2003 (Universal/Mercury)
Those Who Got Away With It, 2003 (Universal/Mercury)
Sleep Together, Wake Apart, 2005 (Alarm/Fast Getaway)
Spending Black Time With You, 2006 (Alarm/Fast Getaway)
Beggars And Chooser, 2007 (Alarm/Fast Getaway)
Love Letters, 2009 (Alarm/Fast Getaway)
Threetwentyone, 2010 (Alarm/Fast Getaway)
Gold Chain, 2010 (Alarm/Fast Getaway)
Act Surprised, 2011 (Alarm/Fast Getaway)
We Go Places, 2012 (Alarm/Fast Getaway)

Compilations:

Det Elektriske Barometer 01, 2001 (DR)
Music From Denmark, 2002 (MXR)
Hanging By A Moment, 2002 (Universal)
The Album, 2003 (Universal)

TV and Film:

100% Greve - TV-series, 2003 (DR)
100% Greve - Featurefilm, 2004 (DR)

Members 

Robert Lund: Vocals, Guitars, Keyboards (1998–present)
Allan Schøneberg: Bass (1998–present)
Claus Bergmann: Drums (1998–present)

Former members 

Samuel Helles: Bass (1998–2007)

Guests 

Recordings:

Kasper Eistrup appeared on Privacy, 2001
Rob Ellis appeared on The Rules of Transportation, 2003 and Knives and Daggers, 2005
Natasha Lea Jones, formerly of Pooka appeared on The Rules of Transportation, 2003

Live:

Rob Ellis was an integrated part of Kitty Wu's concert at the Roskilde Festival in 2003, as a second drummer and keyboard player.

Touring 

Kitty Wu has toured as headliner extensively in- and outside of their native Denmark, as well as having supported, among others, Muse (Scandinavian tour), Kashmir (Danish Tour), Sort Sol (Danish Tour) and Brendan Benson (German tour).
After releasing their debut album, Kitty Wu was picked to play the main Stage at The Roskilde Festival in 2001.

References

External links 
 kittywu.com
 

Danish alternative rock groups